Stockholm syndrome is a proposed condition in which hostages develop a psychological bond with their captors. It is supposed to result from a rather specific set of circumstances, namely the power imbalances contained in hostage-taking, kidnapping, and abusive relationships. Therefore, it is difficult to find a large number of people who experience Stockholm syndrome to conduct studies with any sort of power. This makes it hard to determine trends in the development and effects of the condition—and, in fact, it is a "contested illness" due to doubts about the legitimacy of the condition. 

Emotional bonds may be formed between captors and captives, during intimate time together, but these are generally considered irrational in light of the danger or risk endured by the victims. Stockholm syndrome has never been included in the Diagnostic and Statistical Manual of Mental Disorders or DSM, the standard tool for diagnosis of psychiatric illnesses and disorders in the US, mainly due to the lack of a consistent body of academic research. The syndrome is rare: according to data from the FBI, about 8% of hostage victims show evidence of Stockholm syndrome.

This term was first used by the media in 1973 when four hostages were taken during a bank robbery in Stockholm, Sweden. The hostages defended their captors after being released and would not agree to testify in court against them. It was noted that in this case, however, the police were perceived to have acted with little care for the hostages' safety, providing an alternative reason for their unwillingness to testify. Stockholm syndrome is paradoxical because the sympathetic sentiments that captives feel towards their captors are the opposite of the fear and disdain which an onlooker might feel towards the captors.

There are four key components that characterize Stockholm syndrome:

 A hostage's development of positive feelings towards the captor
 No previous relationship between hostage and captor
 A refusal by hostages to cooperate with police and other government authorities
 A hostage's belief in the humanity of the captor, ceasing to perceive them as a threat, when the victim holds the same values as the aggressor.

History

Stockholm bank robbery 

In 1973, Jan-Erik Olsson, a convict on parole, took four employees (three women and one man) of Kreditbanken, one of the largest banks in Stockholm, Sweden, hostage during a failed bank robbery. He negotiated the release from prison of his friend Clark Olofsson to assist him. They held the hostages captive for six days (23–28 August) in one of the bank's vaults. When the hostages were released, none of them would testify against either captor in court; instead, they began raising money for their defense.

Nils Bejerot, a Swedish criminologist and psychiatrist coined the term after the Stockholm police asked him for assistance with analyzing the victims' reactions to the 1973 bank robbery and their status as hostages. As the idea of brainwashing was not a new concept, Bejerot, speaking on "a news cast after the captives' release" described the hostages' reactions as a result of being brainwashed by their captors. He called it Norrmalmstorgssyndromet (after Norrmalmstorg Square where the attempted robbery took place), meaning "the Norrmalmstorg syndrome"; it later became known outside Sweden as Stockholm syndrome. It was originally defined by psychiatrist Frank Ochberg to aid the management of hostage situations.

This analysis was provided by Nils Bejerot after he was criticized on Swedish radio by Kristin Enmark, one of the hostages. Enmark claims she had strategically established a rapport with the captors. She had criticized Bejerot for endangering their lives by behaving aggressively and agitating the captors. She had criticized the police for pointing guns at the convicts while the hostages were in the line of fire and she had told news outlets that one of the captors tried to protect the hostages from being caught in the crossfire. She was also critical of prime minister Olof Palme, as she had negotiated with the captors for freedom, but the prime minister told her that she would have to content herself to die at her post rather than give in to the captors' demands.

Olsson later said in an interview:It was the hostages' fault. They did everything I told them to. If they hadn't, I might not be here now. Why didn't any of them attack me? They made it hard to kill. They made us go on living together day after day, like goats, in that filth. There was nothing to do but get to know each other.

Patty Hearst 
Patty Hearst, the granddaughter of publisher William Randolph Hearst, was taken and held hostage by the Symbionese Liberation Army, "an urban guerilla group", in 1974. She was recorded denouncing her family as well as the police under her new name, "Tania", and was later seen working with the SLA to rob banks in San Francisco. She publicly asserted her "sympathetic feelings" toward the SLA and their pursuits as well. After her 1975 arrest, pleading Stockholm syndrome (although the term was not used then, due to the recency of the event) did not work as a proper defense in court, much to the chagrin of her defense lawyer F. Lee Bailey. Her seven-year prison sentence was later commuted, and she was eventually pardoned by President Bill Clinton, who was informed that she was not acting under her own free will.

Sexual abuse victims 
There is evidence that some victims of childhood sexual abuse come to feel a connection with their abuser. They often feel flattered by adult attention or are afraid that disclosure will create family disruption. In adulthood, they resist disclosure for emotional and personal reasons. An example of such was exhibited in the Jaycee Dugard abduction case.

Lima syndrome

An inversion of Stockholm syndrome, called Lima syndrome, has been proposed, in which abductors develop sympathy for their hostages. An abductor may also have second thoughts or experience empathy towards their victims.

Lima syndrome was named after an abduction at the Japanese embassy in Lima, Peru, in 1996, when members of a militant movement took hostage hundreds of people attending a party at the official residence of Japan's ambassador.

Symptoms and behaviors 
Victims of the formal definition of Stockholm syndrome develop "positive feelings toward their captors and sympathy for their causes and goals, and negative feelings toward the police or authorities". These symptoms often follow escaped victims back into their previously ordinary lives.

Physical and psychological effects 
 Cognitive: confusion, blurred memory, delusion, and recurring flashbacks.
 Emotional: lack of feeling, fear, helplessness, hopelessness, aggression, depression, guilt, dependence on captor, and development of post-traumatic stress disorder (PTSD).
 Social: anxiety, irritability, cautiousness, and estrangement. 
 Physical: increase in effects of pre-existing conditions; development of health conditions due to possible restriction from food, sleep, and exposure to outdoors.

Criticism

Robbins and Anthony (1982) 
Robbins and Anthony, who had historically studied a condition similar to Stockholm syndrome, known as destructive cult disorder, observed in their 1982 study that the 1970s were rich with apprehension surrounding the potential risks of brainwashing. They assert that media attention to brainwashing during this time resulted in the fluid reception of Stockholm syndrome as a psychological condition.

FBI law enforcement bulletin (1999) 
A 1998 report by the FBI containing over 1,200 hostage incidents found that only 8% of kidnapping victims showed signs of Stockholm syndrome. When victims who showed negative and positive feelings toward the law enforcement personnel are excluded, the percentage decreases to 5%. A survey of 600 police agencies in 1989, performed by the FBI and the University of Vermont, found not a single case when emotional involvement between the victim and the kidnapper interfered with or jeopardized an assault. In short, this database provides empirical support that the Stockholm syndrome remains a rare occurrence. The sensational nature of dramatic cases causes the public to perceive this phenomenon as the rule rather than the exception. The bulletin concludes that, although depicted in fiction and film and often referred to by the news media, the phenomenon actually occurs rarely. Therefore, crisis negotiators should place the Stockholm syndrome in proper perspective.

Namnyak et al. (2008) 
A research group led by Namnyak has found that although there is a lot of media coverage of Stockholm syndrome, there has not been a lot of research into the phenomenon. What little research has been done is often contradictory and does not always agree on what Stockholm syndrome is. The term has grown beyond kidnappings to all definitions of abuse. It stated that there is no clear definition of symptoms to diagnose the syndrome.

Diagnostic and Statistical Manual (DSM 5, 2013) 
The DSM-5 is widely used as the "classification system for psychological disorders" by the American Psychiatric Association. Stockholm syndrome has not historically appeared in the manual, as many believe it falls under trauma bonding or post-traumatic stress disorder (PTSD) and there is no consensus about the correct clarification. In addition, there is no extensive body of research or consensus to help solve the argument, although before the fifth edition (DSM 5) was released, Stockholm syndrome was under consideration to be included under 'Disorders of Extreme Stress, Not Otherwise Specified'.

Allan Wade (2015) 
At Dignity Conference 2015, Dr Allan Wade presented The myth of “Stockholm Syndrome” (and other concepts invented to discredit women victims of violence) after interviewing Kristin Enmark. In this presentation he posits that “Stockholm Syndrome” and related ideas such as “traumatic bonding”, “learned helplessness”, “battered women’s syndrome”, “internalized oppression”, and “identification with the aggressor/oppressor” shift the focus away from actual events in context to invented pathologies in the minds of victims, particularly women. “Stockholm syndrome” can be seen as one of many concepts used to silence individuals who, as victims, speak publicly about negative social (i.e., institutional) responses.

Jess Hill (2019) 
In her 2019 treatise on domestic violence See What You Made Me Do, Australian journalist Jess Hill described the syndrome as a "dubious pathology with no diagnostic criteria", and stated that it is "riddled with misogyny and founded on a lie"; she also noted that a 2008 literature review revealed "most diagnoses [of Stockholm syndrome] are made by the media, not by psychologists or psychiatrists." In particular, Hill's analysis revealed that Stockholm authorities — under direct guidance from Bejerot — responded to the robbery in a way that put the hostages at greater risk from the police than from their captors (hostage Kristin Enmark, who during the siege was granted a phone call with Swedish Prime Minister Olof Palme, reported that Palme told her that the government would not negotiate with criminals, and that "you will have to content yourself that you will have died at your post"); as well, she observed that not only was Bejerot's diagnosis of Enmark made without ever having spoken to her, it was in direct response to her public criticism of his actions during the siege.

See also

References

External links

Abuse
Hostage taking
Mind control
Interpersonal relationships
1973 neologisms